A triumphal entry is a ceremonial entry by a person, often into a city.  

Roman triumph, awarded to successful generals in Ancient Rome
Triumphal entry into Jerusalem by Jesus Christ, commemorated on Palm Sunday

See also
Royal Entry, for European ceremonies from the Middle Ages onward
Triumphal arch, a monumental structure